Rockwell is a slab serif typeface designed by the Monotype Corporation and released in 1934. The project was supervised by Monotype's engineering manager Frank Hinman Pierpont. This typeface is distinguished by a serif at the apex of the uppercase A, while the lowercase a has two storeys. Because of its monoweighted stroke, Rockwell is used primarily for display or at small sizes rather than as a body text. Rockwell is based on an earlier, more condensed slab serif design cast by the Inland Type Foundry called Litho Antique.

Rockwell is a geometric slab-serif with a monoline construction, with all of its strokes appearing to be roughly the same width and its capital O roughly circular. This gives it a similar impression to common sans-serif designs of the period like Akzidenz Grotesk, Franklin Gothic, or Futura. Rockwell is influenced by a style of geometric slab serif that had become popular around the time, including the earlier Memphis and Beton, and less similarly Stymie and City.

Rockwell has remained popular and been digitised, although a shadowed weight has not been.

Bitstream offers a lookalike/clone of Rockwell, under the name Geometric Slabserif 712.

Vernon Adams designed the Rokkitt typeface, which inspired from Rockwell.

Usage
The Guinness World Records used Rockwell in some of its early-1990s editions. Informational signage at Expo 86 made extensive use of the Rockwell typeface. Docklands Light Railway used a bold weight of this typeface in the late 1980s and early 1990s. The poetry publisher Tall Lighthouse also uses Rockwell in all of its books, as well as on its website.

American fast food chain Arby’s uses Rockwell font in its advertising, most notably in its slogan, “We Have The Meats”.

References

External links
 Fonts in Use
 Rockwell Shadow from a specimen book

Monotype typefaces
Geometric slab-serif typefaces
Typefaces and fonts introduced in 1934
Display typefaces